Mark Pierre Gunn (born July 24, 1968) is a former professional American football player who played defensive tackle in the National Football League. He played for the New York Jets (1991–1994, 1996), the New Orleans Saints (1994) and Philadelphia Eagles (1995–1996)

References

1968 births
Living people
American football defensive tackles
New York Jets players
New Orleans Saints players
Philadelphia Eagles players
Pittsburgh Panthers football players